Beech Grove Cemetery is a large historical cemetery and national historic district located at Muncie, Indiana. It was listed on the National Register of Historic Places in 1999.

Background information 
Beech Grove Cemetery was established in 1841 and is a municipal facility supported by a combination of private and public funding. The entrance gate, completed in 1904, was designed by architect Marshall S. Mahurin.  The Gothic Revival style administration building was added in 1921–1923.  It was renovated in 1974 and redecorated in 1991.  The earliest mausoleum dates to 1904.

The cemetery is governed by a board of directors, whose members are appointed by the Muncie City Council. The Muncie Public Library is partnered with the Beech Grove Cemetery and has an online database of all their burials. It is a part of the Muncie / Delaware County Digital Resource Library. There are over 42,000 burials.

Notable burials
 John Ottis Adams (1851–1927), artist
 The five Ball Brothers, founders of the Ball Corporation
 William J. Carson (1840−1913), Civil War Medal of Honor recipient
 Congressman George W. Cromer (1856–1936)
 Congressman Andrew Kennedy (1810–1847)
 Anna Augusta Truitt (1837–1920), philanthropist, temperance reformer, essayist

See also 
 List of cemeteries in Indiana

References

External links

 
 

Cemeteries on the National Register of Historic Places in Indiana
Gothic Revival architecture in Indiana
1841 establishments in Indiana
Protected areas of Delaware County, Indiana
Cemeteries in Indiana
Tourist attractions in Muncie, Indiana
Historic American Buildings Survey in Indiana
National Register of Historic Places in Muncie, Indiana
Historic districts in Muncie, Indiana
Historic districts on the National Register of Historic Places in Indiana